Xenia Francesca Palazzo (born 29 April 1998) is an Italian Paralympic swimmer of Russian descent who competes in international level events,  She competed at the 2016 Summer Paralympics, and 2020 Summer Paralympics, in Women's 100m Backstroke - S8, Women's 200 individual medley SM8 winning a silver medal, Women's 4×100 freestyle relay P34 winning a gold medal, Women's 400 freestyle S8 winning a bronze medal and in Women's 50 metre freestyle S8, winning a bronze medal.

Life 
She was born with hypoxic ischemic encephalopathy which has caused her to not have enough oxygen and blood due to disseminated intravascular coagulation and had a brain haemorrhage which has resulted in quadriplegia mainly on the right side of her body.

Her highest achievements are becoming a World silver medalist and a European champion, in 200 meter medley and 400 meter freestyle.

See also
Italy at the 2020 Summer Paralympics

References

External links
 
 

1998 births
Living people
Sportspeople from Palermo
Sportspeople from Verona
Paralympic swimmers of Italy
Italian female freestyle swimmers
Italian female medley swimmers
Medalists at the World Para Swimming Championships
Medalists at the World Para Swimming European Championships
Swimmers at the 2016 Summer Paralympics
Swimmers at the 2020 Summer Paralympics
Medalists at the 2020 Summer Paralympics
Paralympic silver medalists for Italy
Paralympic bronze medalists for Italy
Paralympic medalists in swimming
Italian people of Russian descent
Paralympic gold medalists for Italy
S8-classified Paralympic swimmers
21st-century Italian women